Halovulum is a Gram-negative and aerobic genus of bacteria from the family of Rhodobacteraceae with one known species (Halovulum dunhuangense). Halovulum dunhuangense has been isolated from a spring from Dunhuang in China.

References

Rhodobacteraceae
Bacteria genera
Monotypic bacteria genera